Belong may refer to:

Music
 Belong (band), an American experimental music duo

Albums
 Belong (Kevin Walker album) or the title song, 2013
 Belong (The Pains of Being Pure at Heart album) or the title song, 2011
 Belong, by San Fermin, or the title song, 2017
 Belong, an EP by X Ambassadors, 2020

Songs
 "Belong" (Axwell and Shapov song), 2016
 "Belong", by Conrad Sewell from Life, 2019
 "Belong", by Dashboard Confessional from Crooked Shadows, 2018
 "Belong", by Editors from Violence, 2018
 "Belong", by Hilary Duff from Breathe In. Breathe Out., 2015
 "Belong", by Joshua Radin, 2015
 "Belong", by R.E.M. from Out of Time, 1991

Other uses
 Belongingness, a human need for membership in a group
 Belong (play), a play by Bola Agbaje
 Belong Ltd, a British care home provider
 Belong, a low-cost internet service provider operated by Telstra

See also
 Belonging (disambiguation)